Teymur Beyglu (also Romanized as Teymūr Beyglū) is a village in Minjavan-e Gharbi Rural District, Minjavan District, Khoda Afarin County, East Azerbaijan Province, Iran. At the 2006 census, its population was 54, consisting of 11 families.

References 

Populated places in Khoda Afarin County